Actinocoris is a genus of true bugs belonging to the family Miridae.

Species:
 Actinocoris signatus Reuter, 1878

References

Miridae